The Alfa Romeo Giulietta Sprint Speciale (Tipo 750 SS/101.20, Italian for "Type 750 SS/101.20") and Alfa Romeo Giulia Sprint Speciale (Tipo 101.21), also known as Giulietta SS and Giulia SS, are small sports cars manufactured by Alfa Romeo from 1959 to 1966.

Giulietta Sprint Speciale

Tipo 750 SS

The first prototype of the Giulietta SS was presented in 1957 at the Turin Motor Show. After two more prototypes were presented in car shows, the official presentation of the production version for the press was on 24 June 1959 on the Monza race track. The first 101 cars produced had "low nose" and 750 SS designation. 100 cars minimum were needed to homologate a car in FIA regulations. While there were some all-aluminium cars produced, the majority of these cars had steel bodies with aluminium doors, engine bonnet and boot lid. Also first cars were equipped with Weber 40 DCO3 carburettors, later changed to 40 DCOE2.
The drag coefficient of the Sprint Speciale is 0.28, the same as a Chevrolet Corvette (C6), and was not surpassed for more than twenty years. Cars used the 1,290 cc Alfa Romeo Twin Cam engine, a design with hemispheric combustion chambers and valves controlled directly by twin overhead camshafts.

Tipo 101.20

Small changes to a production version included steel doors, Weber 40 DCOE2 carburetors, higher front nose, removal of plexiglas windows. Bumpers were fitted front and rear, also cars had some minimal sound-proofing. The 1.3 litre engine and gearbox was the same as used in race-oriented Giulietta Sprint Zagato. All Giuliettas SS had three-shoe drum brakes at front wheels and drum brakes at the rear. Export versions had 101.17 designation. Side badges had "Giulietta Sprint Speciale" script.

Giulia Sprint Speciale

Giulia Sprint Speciale Bertone Prototipo
There was a prototype by Bertone of a replacement for Giulietta SS, named "Giulia SS Bertone Prototipo", but the new shape did not enter production and the next generation Giulia SS carried over an unchanged  Giulietta SS body. The car was designed in 1965 by Giorgetto Giugiaro during the end of his stay at Bertone.

Tipo 101.21

The bigger engine 1.6 L Giulia series replaced the Giulietta and was introduced at the March 1963 Geneva Motor Show. As Giulietta is the diminutive for Giulia in Italian, the new Giulia name was a wordplay hinting that the new car was a grown-up version of the Giulietta. In spite of a Giulia SS prototype, Alfa Romeo decided to retain the Giulietta-shaped SS in production. The 1,570cc engine made up to  possible. The 1,570cc engine with Weber 40 DCOE2 carburetors was taken from Giulia Sprint Veloce and delivered  of power. Most Giulia SS had disc brakes at front wheels. An easy way to distinguish the Giulia SS from the Giulietta SS is by the dashboard. The Giulia has a leather underside with the glovebox at a different angle than the main fascia. The dashboard in the Giulietta is sloping and painted in one colour without a leather underside. Side badges carried "Giulia SS" scripts.
Production ended in 1965, with a last single Sprint Speciale completed in 1966.

1,366 Giulietta Sprint Speciale and 1,400 Giulia Sprint Speciale were produced. 25 cars were converted to right hand drive by RuddSpeed.

See also
Alfa Romeo Giulietta (750/101)
Alfa Romeo Giulia
SSZ Stradale

Notes

References

External links

Sprint Speciale Register

Giulietta Sprint Speciale
1960s cars
Cars introduced in 1959
Coupés
Rear-wheel-drive vehicles